Helge Slaatto (born 1952, in Oslo) is a Professor of violin at the Music Academy of the  Westphalian Wilhelms University in Münster.

Life 
He studied with Maria Lidka, Sándor Végh, and Dorothy Delay and worked as concertmaster with the Odense Symphony Orchestra and Athelas ensemble Copenhagen. He is a performer of contemporary music and performs as a soloist at, among others, the King ensemble London, Koechlin ensemble, Randers Kammerorkester Denmark, the Bergen Festival and the Cantiere Internazionale d'Arte Montepulciano. He leads master classes in Germany, Greece, Denmark and Portugal. 2008-2010 he was the Dean of the College of music at the Westphalian Wilhelms University in Münster.

Discography 
Helge Slaatto has produced the following CDs:

Students 
Suyoen Kim, Antoine Morales

References

External links 
 Official site of Helge Slaatto and Frank Reinecke
 Profil at the Westfälischen Wilhelms-Universität Münster
 
  at Allmusic
 Helge Slaatto on Meisterkurse.com 

1952 births
Norwegian classical violinists
Academic staff of the University of Münster
Living people
Musicians from Oslo
20th-century Norwegian violinists
20th-century classical violinists
21st-century Norwegian violinists
21st-century classical violinists